Carl Emil Mundt (4 April 1802 – 22 December 1873) was a Danish educator and politician. He was a member of the 1848 Danish Constituent Assembly, representing Sorø. He was the father of painter Emilie Mundt.

Early life and education
Mundt was born in Copenhagen, the son of goldsmith Philip Mundt (1740-1804) and Mette Christiane née Winther (1757-1827).  He graduated from Metropolitan School in 1821. He visited Rngland together with his brother J.H. Mundt in 1925-26 and obtained a degree in theology from the University of Copenhagen in 1829. He obtained a master's degree in mathematics in 1842.

Career
Mundt was employed as a mathematics teacher at Sorø Academy the following year. He left Sorø Academy in connection with its reorganisation in 1849 but was awarded a temporary compensation and title of professor and that same year. He was also accepted as a member of the Royal Danish Academy of Sciences. He moved to Frederiksberg a few years later and started working as a supervisor in the realskole system. He was awarded the Order of the Dannebrog in 1869.

Politics
In 1848, Mundt was elected for the Danish Constituent Assembly in the Sorø Constituency. He became a member of the Landsting in 1854 but lost his mandate at the 1855 reelection.

Written works
Mundt's only scientific work publications were his doctoral dissertation and one other work. He wrote a number of textbooks on mathematics and astronomy. These included:
 Elementær plangeometri (1838)
 Ledetråd ved regneundervisningen (1839)
 Eelementær stereometri
 Lærebog i astronomien (1855)
 Grundtræk af Astronomien (1859)
 Lærebøger i trigonometri (1857)
 Lærebog i algebra (1873)

Personal life
Mundt married Caroline (Amalie) Jørgensen (1808-1845), a daughter of miller Hans Henrik Jørgensen (1772-1828) and Sophie Frederikke Pedersen (1776-1832), on 3 August 1833 in Bromme.  They had three children: Lawyer Jodochus Henrik Mundt, painter Emilie Mundt and medical doctor Christopher Mundt.

He died on 22 December 1873 and is buried in Sorø Old Cemetery.

References

External links
 Carl Emil Mundt at geni.com

19th-century Danish educators
19th-century Danish politicians
1802  births
1873 deaths
Order of the Dannebrog
Members of the Constituent Assembly of Denmark